Pleasington Priory, or the Church of St Mary and St John Baptist, is a Catholic church in the village of Pleasington, Lancashire, England.  It is recorded in the National Heritage List for England as a designated Grade I listed building. The architectural historian Nikolaus Pevsner describes it as being "an astonishing church", and the citation in the National Heritage List for England states it is an "exceptional form of Catholic chapel for the period before Emancipation".

History
The church was built between 1816 and 1819 as a thank offering by John Francis Butler at a cost of £23,000 (£ as of ), the architect being John Palmer and the sculptor Thomas Owen.

In 2018, with the retirement of the Parish Priest Canon Kevin Kenny, Pleasington Priory ceased to be an independent parish and was joined with the neighbouring parishes of St Peter in Chains, Mill Hill, and St John Vianney, Livesey to form the new joint parish of St Oscar Romero. The Parish Priest, Fr Shaun Braiden residing at St Peter's.

Architecture

Exterior
The church is built in ashlar with slate roofs.  It is a large, tall church with mixed Gothic styles.  Its plan consists of a five-bay nave with a clerestory, north and south aisles, and a polygonal apse.  Entry to the church is at the west through a three-order portal above which are three statues on corbels. On the underside of the middle corbel is a bust of John Butler in military uniform. Above the statue is a carved arch, then a small parapet and a large rose window, and a gable with an openwork parapet surmounted by a crocketed cross.  At each side of the portal is an octagonal turret with a three-stage pinnacle.  Outside the turrets are offices, each with a niche containing on one side the name of the architect and on the other the sculptor.  The aisles have five five-light windows and are battlemented; the clerestory has triple lancet windows and an openwork parapet.  The apse has tall, five-light, Perpendicular windows.  On the south side is a priest's door.

Interior
The ceiling is rib vaulted with carved bosses and there are four-bay arcades with dogtooth decoration.  On each side of the altar is a carved relief, one showing the Beheading of St John, the other Mary Magdalene.

External features
The churchyard contains the war graves of eight service personnel of the First World War, and nine of the Second World War.

See also

Grade I listed churches in Lancashire
Listed buildings in Pleasington

References

Further reading

External links
Lancashire churches

1819 establishments in England
19th-century Roman Catholic church buildings in the United Kingdom
Buildings and structures in Blackburn with Darwen
Commonwealth War Graves Commission cemeteries in England
Gothic Revival architecture in Lancashire
Grade I listed churches in Lancashire
Roman Catholic churches completed in 1819
Roman Catholic churches in Lancashire
Roman Catholic Diocese of Salford